Stadion v Jiráskově ulici is a multi-use stadium in Jihlava, Czech Republic.  It is currently used mostly for football matches and is the home ground of FC Vysočina Jihlava. The stadium holds 4,082 people on an all-seater basis.

Redevelopment 
After Jihlava won promotion to the Czech First League in 2005, league rules stipulated 4,000 seated places must be available at their stadium. The club were allowed to continue playing at Stadion v Jiráskově ulici for the first half of the season while upgrades were carried out. Work began on a development of the stadium in 2005, which included the installation of four new floodlight towers. Work costing a total of 180 million Czech koruna was officially completed in 2006 as the club re-opened the stadium, featuring a new 4,025 capacity. The club set an attendance record in October 2006 when the new grandstand was opened for the first time, welcoming a crowd of 3,100 to the match against FC Zenit Čáslav, which Jihlava won 2–0.

Another redevelopment was required after the club was promoted to the top flight in 2012. The club added under-soil heating in the summer of 2012 as part of upgrades to make the stadium suitable for Czech First League use.

Notable matches
Stadion v Jiráskově ulici hosted the final of the 2010–11 Czech Cup, a 1–1 draw between Mladá Boleslav and Sigma Olomouc. Boleslav went on to win 4–3 on penalties. This was only the third final to be held outside of Prague since the competition began in the 1993–94 season.

References

External links
 Information at FC Vysočina Jihlava website
 Photo gallery and data at Erlebnis-stadion.de

Football venues in the Czech Republic
Czech First League venues
FC Vysočina Jihlava
Buildings and structures in Jihlava
Sports venues completed in 1955
1955 establishments in Czechoslovakia
20th-century architecture in the Czech Republic